The "London Letters" were a series of fifteen articles written by George Orwell when invasion by Nazi Germany seemed imminent, and published in the American left-wing literary magazine Partisan Review. As well as these "London Letters", PR also published other articles by Orwell.

Time line 
On 3 January 1941 Orwell sent the first of his fifteen "London Letters" which were to appear in PR over the next five and a half years. It was included in the March–April 1941 issue.

March–April 1941:
July–August 1941: In his second "London Letter," Orwell answered ten questions – although each question included several sub-questions – put to him by PR on issues such as the tone of the popular press; current British writing; the morale of the regular army; the Home Guard; Labour Party politicians; the amount of democracy and civil liberties; the war economy and the war effort; support for the government.
November–December 1941:
March–April 1942: Nothing is happening politically in England. Certain currents of thought: Whom are we fighting against? (New German daily paper, Die Zeitung (mildly Left, circulation 60,000), for German refugees; Blimps using Vansittart’s thesis that all Germans are wicked, not merely the Nazis, to divert from the fact of fighting against Fascism; "The pinks cannot admit that the German masses are behind Hitler any more than the Blimps can admit that their class must be levered out of control if we are to win the war."; "Ordinary working people do not seem to hate the Germans... All the blame for everything is placed on Hitler."); Our Allies ("tremendous net increase of pro-Russian sentiment"; enormous hammer and sickle flag flies over Selfridges; ordinary people fail to grasp that there is any connexion between Moscow and the Communist Party; Daily Worker still banned but now sold under title of British Worker; immense amount of anti-American feeling; English xenophobia is being broken down by presence of large numbers of foreigners, but plenty of people disagree with him; certain amount of "disquieting" antisemitism); Defeatism and German Propaganda (right-wing defeatism is exemplified by Truth, distinctly influential weekly, "stronghold for the very worst kind of right-wing Toryism", advertisements for banks and insurance companies is significant; questions in Parliament revealed it is partly owned by Conservative Party machine; left-wing defeatism is more interesting: ILP is preaching a watered version of the Partisan Review’s Ten Commandments, never clearly stating whether it 'supports' the war; "increasing overlap between Fascism and pacifism"; "With the out-and-out, turn-the-other-cheek pacifists, phenomenon of people started by renouncing violence, ending by championing Hitler"; antisemitic motif very strong, usually soft-pedalled in print; "since there is no real answer to the charge that pacifism is objectively pro-Fascist, nearly all pacifist literature... specialises in avoiding awkward questions"; example of Middleton Murry’s Adelphi and Peace News; example of Now, with contributions by the Duke of Beford, Alex Comfort, Julian Symons and Hugh Ross Williamson; German radio propaganda: New British Broadcasting Station, Workers’ Challenge Station, Christian Peace Movement and Radio Caledonia (Scottish nationalism); intellectuals in France who were ready to go over: Drieu la Rochelle, Pound and Céline; "All is very quiet on the literary front" with paper shortage favouring very short books; corrected mistake made in earlier letter re. Dylan Thomas being in the army, now working for BBC and MOI); tobacco situation "has righted itself"; matches very short; watering the beer, third time since rearmament; absence of air raids relaxes black-out; few people sleeping in Tube stations; basements of demolished houses bricked up to use as water tanks in case of fire.
July–August 1942:
November–December 1942:
March–April 1943:
July–August 1943:
Spring 1944: (sent 1944-01-15)
Summer 1944: (sent 1944-04-17)
Fall 1944: (sent 1944-07-24) "It seems to be taken for granted that there will be a General election before the end of the year."; All parties compete to "cash in on the popularity of the U.S.S.R."; MOI and BBC consider Stalin and Franco "completely sacrosanct"; Common Wealth continues to do well at by-elections; Domestic issues dominate people's attention: demobilisation, rehousing ("already serious, is going to be appalling"), the birthrate ("cannot be expected to rise unless people have houses to live in..."); Conservatives more concerned and "preaching to the working class the duty of self-sacrifice and the wickedness of birth control" while the "Left tends to evade this problem"; "Basic questions that the Left habitually ignores"; "The Tories are not only more courageous, ... and they have no scruples about breaking the promises they do make."; "The Communists are using the slogan 'Make Germany Pay' (the diehard Tory slogan of 1918)"; The distinction between first class and third class on the railways is being enforced again."; "Home Guard now consists of youths who are conscripted at sixteen or seventeen."; "...in the remotest places one cannot get away from the roar of aeroplanes, which has become the normal background noise, drowning the larks."; "After nine months as a literary editor I am startled and frightened by the lack of talent and vitality"; In spite of paper shortage there is "an enormous output of unreadable pamphlets" from political parties and religious bodies.
Winter 1944: (sent December 1944) Almost four years since first letter; "suitable moment for a sort of commentary on the previous ones."; "I have to admit that up to ... the end of 1942 I was grossly wrong in my analysis of the situation."; "many mistaken predictions"; "many generalizations based on little or no evidence"; "from time to time, spiteful or misleading remarks about individuals"; "I particularly regret having said in one letter that Julian Symons ‘writes in a vaguely Fascist strain’; a quite unjustified statement based on a single article I probably misunderstood."; "Essential error" in "very first letter" when he stated "that the political reaction already under weigh is not going to make very much ultimate difference" and repeated this in various forms for eighteen months; "Britain is moving towards a planned economy, and class distinctions tend to dwindle, but there has been no real shift of power and no increase in genuine democracy."- "In the United States the development seems to be away from Socialism."; Not concerned [in this article] with correcting the mistakes; "Among British intelligentsia... there were five attitudes towards the war."; "... I don’t share the average English intellectual's hatred of his own country."; "I hate to see England either humiliated or humiliating anybody else."; "To an astonishing extent it is impossible to discover what is happening outside one's own immediate circle."; "One cannot get away from one's own subjective feelings, but at least one can know what they are and make allowance for them."; Latest shortages include feeding bottle teats "unprocurable in some areas... made of reconditioned rubber.. contraceptives are plentiful and made of good rubber." "The Home Guard has been stood down."
Summer 1945: (sent 1945-06-05) Orwell had spent the previous three months in France and Germany (as war correspondent for The Observer; The coming General Election... "I have predicted all along that the Conservatives will win by a small majority, and I stick to this, though not quite so confidently as before, because the tide is obviously running very strongly in the other direction."; "The impending show-down with Russia"; Regarding the Soviet régime and the Nazi concentration camps, "A thing that has struck me in recent years is that the most enormous crimes and disasters – purges, deportations, massacres, famines, imprisonment without trial, aggressive wars, broken treaties; not only fail to excite the big public but can escape notice altogether..."; "Behaviour of the British people during the war... people just keep on keeping on... darts at the pub,... mowing the lawn,... even amid the disorganization caused by the bombing."; "Never would I have prophesied that we could go through nearly six years of war without arriving at either Socialism or Fascism, and with our civil liberties almost intact." letter in a series which "have given me a wonderful feeling of getting my nose above water."; "...Word of praise is due to the censorship department" for letting "these letters through with remarkably little interference."
Fall 1945: (sent 1945-08-15?) Following the General Election, held "after six years of war"; "in a quite orderly way, and throw out a Prime Minister [Winston Churchill] who has enjoyed almost dictatorial powers"; "weakness of all left-wing parties is their inability to tell the truth about the immediate future.... (that people) won’t benefit (from the new economic and political programme) immediately, but only after, say, twenty years."; "The great need of the moment is to make people aware of what is happening and why, and to persuade them that Socialism is a better way of life but not necessarily, in its first stages, a more comfortable one."; "Like everyone else in England, I know very little about [Clement] Attlee... one of those secondary figures who step into a leading position because of the death or resignation of somebody else,..."; "The salaried and professional middle class has now largely 'gone left', and its votes were an important factor in swinging the election."; "The news of the Japanese surrender came in yesterday about lunchtime,..."; "Much speculation as to ‘whether the Russians have got it [the atomic bomb] too’."
Summer 1946: (Early May? 1946) "The standing of the Labour Government"; "‘Underground’ Communist M.P.s – that is, M.P.s elected as Labour men but secretly members of the C.P. or reliably sympathetic to it."; Petrol rationing, and forgery of petrol coupons; consumer goods; "...top-hats, for the first time in six years or more..."; "...more literary monthlies and quarterlies have come into being."; BBC... "...anything in the smallest degree highbrow provokes storms of indignation from ordinary radio-users."

A controversy 
The September–October 1942 issue of PR carried Orwell's reply to letters sent in by D. S. Savage, George Woodcock and Alex Comfort in response to his "London Letter" of the March–April issue, in which he had criticised "left-wing defeatism" and "turn-the-other-cheek" pacifists, stating that they were "objectively pro-Fascist". In his article he had mentioned several people by name, including Comfort, and referred to the review Now, of which Woodcock was editor, as an example of "the overlap between Fascism and pacifism" for publishing contributions by authors who defended these tendencies. In his reply, Orwell reiterated that "Pacifism is objectively pro-Fascist"; defended his work for the BBC's Indian broadcasts and refuted Comfort's accusation that he was "intellectual-hunting again".

See also 
Bibliography of George Orwell

References 

1941 essays
1942 essays
1943 essays
1944 essays
1945 essays
1946 essays
Essays by George Orwell
Works originally published in Partisan Review